Mingoval is a commune in the Pas-de-Calais department in the Hauts-de-France region of France.

Geography

Population

Places of interest
 The church of St.Liévin, dating from the eighteenth century.
 The seventeenth century cemetery entrance.
 An old farmhouse.

See also
Communes of the Pas-de-Calais department

References

Communes of Pas-de-Calais